Christian Wilhelm Allers (6 August 1857 – 19 October 1915) was a German painter and printmaker.

Biography

Allers, the son of a merchant, was born in Hamburg. He first worked as a lithographer, and in 1877 he moved to Karlsruhe where he continued to work as a lithographer. In the Kunstakademie (state academy of fine arts) he was a scholar of Prof. Ferdinand Keller.

From 1880–81 he served in the German navy in Kiel where Anton Alexander von Werner supported him. In Kiel he got to know Klaus Groth, who became a friend of his.

Allers became well known when he published his collection of prints "Club Eintracht" in 1888. Several other books and maps (collections of prints) followed, by way of example Bismarck, so at the beginning of the 1890s he was able to build a villa on Capri. He lived there for many years, also spending some time in Hamburg, Karlsruhe, and travelling around the world.

In autumn 1902, there was a scandal. Friedrich Alfred Krupp, another famous person living in Capri, was accused by some Italian newspapers of homosexuality and pederasty. Some weeks later, Allers was accused, by court. Krupp died some weeks later, presumably a suicide. Allers managed to escape before the lawsuit began, which led to a sentence of 4½ years imprisonment, pronounced in absentia. According to Tito Fiorani, "Allers had distinctly homosexual tendencies, and liked to surround himself with boys, whom he often used as models".

Allers left Capri and began travelling around the world for more than 10 years, staying some time in New Zealand, Samoa, and Australia. During this time, he often used the pseudonym "W. Andresen", and earned money by making portraits of wealthy people. He died in 1915 in Karlsruhe some months after returning to Germany.

Arts
Allers was a naturalist. His drawings are rich in detail and are of realistic style, so they often lack emotions. 
Although the drawings look realistic, Allers sometimes added persons to scenes who were never at that location.
In this respect, he was not a realist.
Technically, Allers often used pencil. 
To start with, his colored drawings were usually in pencil and were colored later (pastel, oil, ...).
His subjects were:
 Everyday life scenes (e.g. Club Eintracht, Spreeathener, Hochzeitsreise)
 Travel reports (e.g. La Bella Napoli, Rund um die Welt, Unter deutscher Flagge)
 Portraits

Books and collections of prints
 1885 Aus Kamerun. Ein Bilderbuch für kleine und große Kinder.
 1887 Hinter den Coulissen des Circus Renz
 1887 Hamburger Bilder
 1887 The Mikado
 1888 Club Eintracht - Eine Sommerfahrt
 1889 Eine Hochzeitsreise durch die Schweiz
 1889 Spreeathener. Berliner Bilder
 1890 Die Meininger
 1890 Die silberne Hochzeit
 1891 Unsere Marine
 1891 Backschisch
 1892 Capri
 1892 Fürst Bismarck in Friedrichsruh
 1893 La bella Napoli
 1895 Unser Bismarck
 1896 Hochzeitsreise nach Italien
 1898 Das deutsche Jägerbuch
 1898 Rund um die Erde
 1898 Unser Bismarck. Gedächtnis-Ausgabe
 1900 Unter deutscher Flagge
 1902 Das deutsche Corpsleben

Some drawings and paintings

See also
 List of German painters

References

External links

German homepage about C.W.Allers, with additional images and a list of museums

1857 births
1915 deaths
German draughtsmen
19th-century German painters
German male painters
20th-century German painters
20th-century German male artists
German LGBT painters
Artists from Hamburg
Capri, Campania
20th-century German printmakers
19th-century German male artists